The following is a partial list of the "I" codes for Medical Subject Headings (MeSH), as defined by the United States National Library of Medicine (NLM).

This list continues the information at List of MeSH codes (H01). Codes following these are found at List of MeSH codes (I02). For other MeSH codes, see List of MeSH codes.

The source for this content is the set of 2006 MeSH Trees from the NLM.

– social sciences

– anthropology
  – anthropology, cultural
  – archaeology
  – culture
  – acculturation
  – ceremonial behavior
  – circumcision, female
  – civilization
  – arab world
  – western world
  – greek world
  – roman world
  – cross-cultural comparison
  – cultural characteristics
  – cultural diversity
  – cultural evolution
  – ethnology
  – folklore
  – funeral rites
  – human body
  – medicine, traditional
  – ethnopharmacology
  – medicine, African traditional
  – medicine, arabic
  – medicine, unani
  – medicine, ayurvedic
  – medicine, kampo
  – medicine, oriental traditional
  – medicine, chinese traditional
  – qi
  – yin-yang
  – medicine, kampo
  – medicine, tibetan traditional
  – medicine, unani
  – shamanism
  – superstitions
  – magic
  – witchcraft
  – taboo
  – anthropology, physical
  – craniology
  – forensic anthropology
  – paleontology
  – fossils
  – mummies
  – paleodontology
  – paleopathology

– cost of illness

– criminology
  – crime
  – abortion, criminal
  – fraud
  – homicide
  – infanticide
  – sex offenses
  – child abuse, sexual
  – rape
  – theft
  – violence
  – domestic violence
  – child abuse
  – child abuse, sexual
  – munchausen syndrome by proxy
  – elder abuse
  – spouse abuse
  – terrorism
  – bioterrorism
  – chemical terrorism
  – september 11 terrorist attacks
  – torture
  – war crimes
  – holocaust
  – criminal law
  – forensic sciences
  – forensic ballistics
  – forensic anthropology
  – forensic dentistry
  – forensic medicine
  – autopsy
  – blood stains
  – dermatoglyphics
  – dna fingerprinting
  – exhumation
  – forensic pathology
  – forensic psychiatry
  – insanity defense
  – lie detection
  – paternity

– demography
  – age distribution
  – censuses
  – family characteristics
  – birth intervals
  – birth order
  – marital status
  – divorce
  – marriage
  – single person
  – single parent
  – widowhood
  – health status
  – geriatric assessment
  – population dynamics
  – emigration and immigration
  – health transition
  – population control
  – population growth
  – sex distribution
  – sex ratio

– economics
  – capitalism
  – resource allocation
  – health care rationing

– environment design

– forecasting

– government
  – federal government
  – united states government agencies
  – government agencies
  – united states department of agriculture
  – united states department of veterans affairs
  – united states dept. of health and human services
  – united states centers for medicare and medicaid services
  – United States Public Health Service
  – Centers for Disease Control and Prevention (U.S.)
  – national institute for occupational safety and health
  – national center for health care technology
  – national center for health statistics (u.s.)
  – national institutes of health (u.s.)
  – national institute of mental health (u.s.)
  – national library of medicine (u.s.)
  – united states agency for healthcare research and quality
  – United States Food and Drug Administration
  – United States Health Resources and Services Administration
  – national health planning information center
  – united states indian health service
  – united states office of research integrity
  – united states substance abuse and mental health services administration
  – united states environmental protection agency
  – united states federal trade commission
  – united states government agencies
  – united states national aeronautics and space administration
  – United States Occupational Safety and Health Administration
  – united states office of economic opportunity
  – United States Office of Technology Assessment
  – United States Social Security Administration
  – local government
  – state government
  – united states government agencies

– government programs
  – civil defense
  – postal service

– internationality
  – international cooperation
  – developed countries
  – european union
  – developing countries
  – international educational exchange
  – medical missions, official

– political systems
  – capitalism
  – colonialism
  – communism
  – democracy
  – national socialism
  – socialism

– politics
  – lobbying

– private sector

– public sector

– quality of life

– sociology
  – culture
  – acculturation
  – cross-cultural comparison
  – cultural characteristics
  – cultural deprivation
  – cultural diversity
  – psychosocial deprivation
  – family
  – adoption
  – adult children
  – family characteristics
  – marital status
  – divorce
  – marriage
  – single person
  – single parent
  – widowhood
  – illegitimacy
  – nuclear family
  – only child
  – parents
  – fathers
  – mothers
  – single parent
  – surrogate mothers
  – siblings
  – spouses
  – single-parent family
  – hierarchy, social
  – minority groups
  – secularism
  – social change
  – urbanization
  – social class
  – social mobility
  – social conditions
  – anomie
  – social control, formal
  – animal welfare
  – animal care committees
  – animal rights
  – capital punishment
  – coercion
  – government regulation
  – human rights
  – child advocacy
  – civil rights
  – privacy
  – genetic privacy
  – Access to Information
  – patient access to records
  – consumer advocacy
  – freedom
  – personal autonomy
  – patient rights
  – confidentiality
  – genetic privacy
  – informed consent
  – patient access to records
  – right to die
  – treatment refusal
  – reproductive rights
  – social justice
  – women's rights
  – jurisprudence
  – advance directives
  – living wills
  – compensation and redress
  – confidentiality
  – duty to warn
  – genetic privacy
  – contracts
  – criminal law
  – duty to recontact
  – expert testimony
  – forensic psychiatry
  – insanity defense
  – informed consent
  – consent forms
  – third-party consent
  – parental consent
  – intellectual property
  – copyright
  – patents
  – judicial role
  – liability, legal
  – malpractice
  – defensive medicine
  – professional impairment
  – physician impairment
  – mandatory reporting
  – mental competency
  – ownership
  – presumed consent
  – resuscitation orders
  – supreme court decisions
  – wills
  – living wills
  – wrongful life
  – law enforcement
  – legislation, drug
  – drug and narcotic control
  – drug approval
  – mandatory programs
  – mandatory reporting
  – mandatory testing
  – patient advocacy
  – peer review
  – peer review, health care
  – peer review, research
  – police
  – prisons
  – concentration camps
  – social control policies
  – organizational policy
  – public policy
  – family planning policy
  – health policy
  – health care reform
  – nutrition policy
  – social control, informal
  – behavior control
  – coercion
  – public opinion
  – punishment
  – social environment
  – community networks
  – social support
  – social isolation
  – loneliness
  – social alienation
  – social planning
  – city planning
  – environment design
  – urban renewal
  – social problems
  – civil disorders
  – riots
  – crime
  – theft
  – dangerous behavior
  – divorce
  – doping in sports
  – homicide
  – euthanasia
  – euthanasia, active
  – euthanasia, active, voluntary
  – human rights abuses
  – illegitimacy
  – incest
  – juvenile delinquency
  – needle sharing
  – poverty
  – prostitution
  – quackery
  – race relations
  – runaway behavior
  – social behavior disorders
  – general adaptation syndrome
  – suicide
  – suicide, assisted
  – suicide, attempted
  – violence
  – domestic violence
  – child abuse
  – child abuse, sexual
  – munchausen syndrome by proxy
  – elder abuse
  – spouse abuse
  – terrorism
  – bioterrorism
  – chemical terrorism
  – torture
  – war
  – biological warfare
  – bioterrorism
  – chemical warfare
  – chemical terrorism
  – nuclear warfare
  – psychological warfare
  – war crimes
  – holocaust
  – social welfare
  – charities
  – almshouses
  – child welfare
  – child abuse
  – battered child syndrome
  – child abuse, sexual
  – munchausen syndrome by proxy
  – child advocacy
  – child custody
  – child day care centers
  – infant welfare
  – maternal welfare
  – relief work
  – social work
  – social work, psychiatric
  – socialization
  – socioeconomic factors
  – career mobility
  – poverty
  – poverty areas
  – social class
  – social mobility
  – sociometric techniques
  – spatial behavior

The list continues at List of MeSH codes (I02).

I01